New Park Quarry is a  geological Site of Special Scientific Interest in Gloucestershire, notified in 1987. The site is listed in the 'Cotswold District' Local Plan 2001-2011 (on line) as a Regionally Important Geological Site (RIGS).

Location and geology
This site is in the north Cotswolds, near Longborough, and contains the well-preserved remains (disarticulated) of Crocodiles and Dinosaurs. This fauna is in the Chipping Norton Formation and is considered to be the oldest assemblage of dinosaurs from the Jurassic time period in the United Kingdom. The site is of significant importance for research of the ecology and evolution of this species.

References

SSSI Source
 Natural England SSSI information on the citation
 Natural England SSSI information on the New Park Quarry units

External links
 Natural England (SSSI information)

Sites of Special Scientific Interest in Gloucestershire
Sites of Special Scientific Interest notified in 1987
Quarries in Gloucestershire
Cotswolds